The West University of Timișoara (abbreviated UVT) is a public higher education institution located in Timișoara. Classified by the Ministry of National Education as a university of education and scientific research, UVT is one of the nine members of the Universitaria Consortium (the group of Romanian elite universities). Also, the West University is a component institution of the National Research–Development–Innovation System in its capacity as an accredited higher education institution.

The university was founded by the Decree-Law no. 660 issued on 30 December 1944, which stipulates that a university must be created in western Romania. Its first faculties either were dissolved or became independent institutions. These independent higher education institutions became a sole university at the end of September 1962. In 1968 the institution became an independent university. A difficult period followed, especially for the humanities and the exact sciences. Fields of study such as music, fine arts, history, geography, natural sciences and chemistry have all but disappeared, while philology has greatly restricted its activity. As a result, many of the faculties were transferred to other institutions. 1989, the year of the Romanian Revolution, was a turning point in the evolution of the university. It led to the present-day conditions. An essential mentality change took place in the perception of the academic institution, in accordance with the democratic institutions in Western Europe. A substantial institutional reform was carried out, beginning with the redefining of the university's mission by establishing its objectives.

The West University of Timișsoara comprises 11 faculties with the respective departments, as well as a teacher training department. The faculties that operate within UVT offer nationally accredited study programs at bachelor's, master's and doctoral level in the following fields: Arts and Design; Chemistry, Biology, Geography; Economics and Business Administration; Law; Letters, History and Theology; Mathematics and Computer Science; Music and Theater; Physical Education and Sports; Physics; Political Sciences, Philosophy and Communication Sciences; Sociology and Psychology.

History

30 December 1944: Decree-Law no. 660 

The establishment of the West University of Timișoara was a complex and long process. It was done in stages, in an internal and international political, social and economic context marked by World War II and the territorial resettlements caused by the loss of Bessarabia, Northern Bukovina and Hertsa region (in the north), as well as Southern Dobruja (in the south). 1940 brings major changes in the academic life of Timișoara. After the Second Vienna Award, which saw Northern Transylvania ceded to Hungary, the faculties of Agronomy, Theology and Sciences from Cluj relocated to Timișoara. Notable for the establishment of the future West University are the insistent and mobilizing approaches of the politician and culture man  who, through his humanistic and cultural policy ideas, exerted a strong influence in the Romanian society in Banat, between 1920 and 1945.

The West University was formally established by Decree-Law no. 660 of 30 December 1944, promulgated by King Michael I. This act provided for the newly established institute to operate starting with the academic year 1944/1945 with the following specializations: Law, Letters and Philosophy, Sciences, Human Medicine, Veterinary Medicine, Pharmacy and Theology. The transposition of the Decree into reality has provoked contradictory discussions and tensions caused by vainglory and rivalry both locally and regionally; six of the seven faculties of the future West University were claimed by other cities (Arad, Lugoj, Caransebeș), there was the intention of some local ethnic groups to impose a bilingual organization of university education, which endangered the creation and operation of a university with a unitary organizational structure in Timișoara.

The dissensions within the Ephoria of the West University, the increasingly hostile actions of the communist authorities, imposed by the Soviet occupiers, led to the annulment, in essence, of the provisions of the Royal Decree for the establishment of the country's fourth university. In 1945, the government of Petru Groza decreed that the West University would first be a Faculty of Medicine. Obstacles have multiplied. Local and government funding sources were insufficient and, in addition, their management was blamed. Sever Bocu is fired from Ephoria's leadership, which will eventually be dissolved.

1948–1962: Pedagogical Institute 
In the following years, under the pressure of the process of Sovietization of Romania, through the forced transposition of the Soviet economic and cultural models in the USSR, the reorganization of higher education took place. Based on the Decree no. 175 of 3 August 1948 and the Decision no. 263327 of 25 October 1948 regarding the organization of the Romanian higher education, in Timișoara the three-year Pedagogical Institute with the Faculty of Mathematics and Physics was established, having the mission to prepare teachers for grades VIII–XI. The courses of the Pedagogical Institute began on 19 January 1949, in a modest space, with 82 students.

In the academic year 1952/1953, the duration of studies at the Faculty of Mathematics and Physics was set at four years. An evening section also starts operating within the Pedagogical Institute. The academic year 1956/1957 marks a new and important stage in the development of the Institute. The Faculty of Philology was inaugurated, with a duration of studies of five years, distance learning was introduced at the Faculty of Mathematics and Physics, and from the following year, the duration of studies at this faculty becomes five years. A new group of young teachers with great potential arrives in Timisoara, submitting a memorandum to the ministry, requesting its transformation into a university, the separation of departments into distinct faculties and the elaboration by graduates of a diploma thesis. In 1957, the director of the Institute became rector, and the new institution was configured as an educational and cultural center worthy of consideration.

1962–1994: University of Timișoara 

By the Decision of the Council of Ministers no. 999 of 27 September 1962, the memorandum submitted in 1956, which establishes the new organization status and the name of the University of Timișoara, is accepted. In the same year, the works start at the new university building, on Vasile Pârvan Boulevard, under the coordination of the architect . His project was awarded by the State Committee for Construction, Architecture and Systematization (CSCAS) in 1964 and by the Union of Architects in Romania (UAR) in 1967.

In 1967/1968, the newly established Faculty of Economics was added, then the faculties of the three-year Pedagogical Institute. After a period of hybrid operation with specializations with study cycles of three, four and five years (1962–1967), the integration into a unitary university structure is completed. In 1970 there were 12 faculties, with 20 specializations. During the years 1962–1989, the evolution of the university was conditioned, under the strict control of the activities in the Romanian education, of the educational act and of professional training, by ministerial orders and decisions marked ideologically. The inconsistency of the program, with its alleged orientation towards modernization, has led to uncertainty and instability in university structures and activities. Faculties, sections, specializations, departments, disciplines were established and abolished, most often without any good motivation. By 1989, in the University of Timișoara there were only three profiles. The humanist profile, inextricably linked to the concept imagined by the interwar intellectuals, as fundamental to the West University, had become almost non-existent.

After the 1989 Revolution, the reorganization of the university and the democratization of education have raised issues of great importance to the new leadership of the faculties and the university. Tensions, turmoil and efforts to change also took place at the University of Timișoara. From the first days following the abolition of the totalitarian regime, the teachers dismissed the last leadership established by the Communist Party and replaced the rector appointed in October 1989. The philologist  thus became the first rector of the university in the post-communist period. The academic year 1990/1991 opens in a modified framework, with new specializations and faculties: Fine Arts and Design, Physical Education and Sports, Chemistry, Geography, Biology, Psychology and Sociology, Law, Music and Theater Arts, the duration of schooling being established at five years.

1994–present: West University of Timișoara 
On the occasion of the 50th anniversary of the establishment of the West University by Decree-Law no. 600/1944, the Ministry of Education, at the request of the teachers, decides that the name of the institution should be the West University of Timișoara. At the end of the 1995/1996 academic year, the West University of Timișoara had eight faculties, a Department for Teaching Staff Development, 40 long-term specializations, a short-term specialization (three years, Information Technology), 12 master's and in-depth studies specializations, a program of European Higher Education.

The 2000s were one of the most dynamic periods in the history of the university, characterized by a very large number of students, constant concerns for improving infrastructure, by building new buildings. The youngest of the university's faculties, the Faculty of Political Sciences, Philosophy and Communication Sciences, was founded in 2004. Since 2012 UVT is a member of the strongest university consortium in Romania, the Universitaria Consortium, a joint project of five of the most prestigious universities in the country (University of Bucharest, Babeș-Bolyai University of Cluj-Napoca, Alexandru Ioan Cuza University of Iași and the Academy of Economic Studies of Bucharest).

Administration 

The UVT Board of Directors ensures, under the leadership of the UVT Rector, the operative management of the university and implements the decisions of the UVT Senate. The Board of Directors consists of the rector, vice-rectors, deans, the general administrative director and a student representative, appointed by OSUT.

Faculties

Students 

As of 2018, 14,804 students are enrolled in the West University. Between 2008 and 2018, the total number of students decreased by more than 9,000, from almost 24,000 to less than 15,000. Among the causes that led to this decrease are the poor performance of high school students in the baccalaurate exam and the cut in the number of paid places.

2% of students are foreigners. In 2017, 236 foreign students were enrolled in the West University, most of them from Israel, Tunisia, Iraq, Syria, Algeria and Italy. Also, in 2017, 496 Romanian students from abroad were enrolled, most of them from Serbia and Moldova.

Student organizations 
The Organization of Students of the West University of Timișoara (OSUT) is the only union-student organization established at the level of the West University of Timișoara, founded on 27 March 1990, which makes it the most representative organization of the university. It deals with student representation, providing basic services for them and organizing projects. OSUT is a full member of the National Alliance of Student Organizations in Romania (ANOSR) and often active in the European Students' Union (ESU).

Other organizations that operate within the university are:
 Association internationale des étudiants en sciences économiques et commerciales (AIESEC)
 Association for Romanians Abroad Inițiativa
 Exact Science Students' Association from the University of Timișoara (ASSEUT)
 Timișoara Psychology and Sociology Students Association (ASPST)
 European Law Students' Association (ELSA)
 Erasmus Student Network (ESN)
 Timișoara Geography Students Association (GEOTIM)
 Bessarabian Students' Organization from Timișoara (OSB)
 Young Accountants Association (YAA)

Affiliations and international relations 
The Department of International Relations (DRI) is responsible for the UVT activities aimed at fulfilling the strategic internationalization objectives of the university. Within DRI operate the Erasmus+ Office, whose main task is to develop and implement mobility programs and international cooperation projects at UVT under Erasmus+ and EEA Financial Mechanism and the International Cooperation and Foreign Students Office, which provides institutional and informational support to international students and foreign teachers who wish to study and teach at UVT.

The West University of Timișoara is a member of the Agence universitaire de la Francophonie, the European University Association and the International Association of Universities, among others. UVT is also part of the Magna Charta Observatory, a nonprofit organization founded by the University of Bologna and the European University Association. 

UVT has entered into collaboration agreements with 198 universities in 51 countries in Africa, Asia, Europe, North America and South America.

Infrastructure 

The West University of Timișoara has seven buildings:
 the main building of UVT, with an area of 26,319.1 m2: 10 lecture halls and 46 rooms (of which 27 laboratories); added to this are the rooms of the building of the Faculty of Physics (a separate building attached to the main building) with a lecture hall, two classrooms and 25 laboratories;
 the building of the Faculty of Law, with an area of 3,006 m2: four lecture halls, 15 lecture and seminar rooms and a conference room;
 the building of the Faculty of Arts and Design, with an area of 6,175 m2: four lecture and seminar rooms and eight laboratories (studios);
 the building of the Faculty of Economics and Business Administration, with an area of 7,652 m2: a lecture hall, 36 lecture and seminar rooms and six laboratories;
 the building of the Faculty of Chemistry, Biology, Geography, with an area of 4,255 m2: five lecture and seminar rooms and eight laboratories;
 the building of the Faculty of Sociology and Psychology, with an area of 180 m2: two lecture and seminar rooms;
 the building of the Department of Biology and Chemistry, with an area of 725 m2: six laboratories where courses are also held.
Within the main building is the Aula Magna where national and international large-scale events can take place. The West University of Timișoara also has a computer center located within the Faculty of Physics.

Campus 
UVT students are accommodated in the C3, C12, C13, C15, C16, C17 and G4 dormitories in Complexul Studențesc and in the Camelia, Drept and Renașterii dormitories spread in different locations in the city. As of 2018, UVT has a capacity of 3,005 accommodation places (out of the 13,000 in the whole complex). However, UVT can only cover 60% of applications.

Sports facilities 
The West University has two sports halls: one on Vasile Pârvan Boulevard and another on Oituz Street. The first consists of a gym of 151.19 m2 and a sports hall of 538.56 m2. The second was inaugurated in 2015 and covers 1,700 m2. It has locker rooms for athletes and referees, fitness equipment, a doctor's office and 150 seats in the stands. In the Oituz area, UVT representatives intend to arrange several outdoor sports fields, as well as a swimming pool.

Also, in Vasile Pârvan Boulevard there is a handball field, with an area of 600 m², also used for minifootball and a basketball court with bitumen surface.

Eugen Todoran Central University Library 

The library was established by Decree-Law no. 660 of 30 December 1944, issued by King Michael I and named after the Romanian philologist , who, as rector of the university, supported its transformation into an academic library. At first, the library's bookstock consisted mainly of mathematics and physics books and magazines. After the Faculty of Philology was founded in 1956, the library of the Pedagogical Institute acquired an encyclopedic profile and was continuously enriched. Since 1962, with the transformation of the Pedagogical Institute into a university, the Central Library of the University of Timișoara has developed rapidly. Since 1975, it has been entitled to a legal deposit. Since 1992, by Order of the Minister of Education no. 6237 of 14 September, the Library of the University of Timișoara became the Central University Library, an institution of national interest, with legal personality, similar to those in Bucharest, Cluj-Napoca and Iași.

The library operates in a central headquarters, at 4A Vasile Pârvan Boulevard, which consists of two buildings: A – the old building and B – the new building. Branch libraries are organized in the headquarters of some faculties of the West University. As of 2019, the library's bookstock consists of over 1.1 million volumes, and access to them is based on a reader's card issued by the library.

In addition, UVT has its own publishing house and printing house. Founded in 2001, the publishing house covers many fields of study and research: anthropology, ethnology, philology, philosophy, physics, mathematics, psychology, sociology, cultural studies, communication sciences, education sciences, economics, politics, theology, translation studies, etc. It is recognized by the National Council for Scientific Research in Higher Education (CNCSIS).

Planetarium 
The planetarium was inaugurated on 1 January 1964, a first in Romania at that time. The construction of this planetarium, as well as the construction of the astronomical observatory (now property of the Romanian Academy), were possible due to the efforts of astronomer and seismologist , the first rector of the University of Timișoara. It is not open to the general public, and is used by university students, especially those taking astronomy courses at the Faculty of Mathematics and Computer Science.

Art galleries 
The Mansarda Gallery is located in the attic of the Faculty of Arts and Design. The gallery is spacious and adapted for exhibition activities, conferences, round tables, etc.

Rankings 
According to QS World University Rankings, West University of Timișoara ranks 94th among the best universities in Eastern Europe and Central Asia. According to Webometrics Ranking of World Universities, UVT ranks 1334th in the world and 5th in the country. In Round University Ranking, which measures the performance of universities based on 20 performance indicators grouped into four categories – teaching (40%), research (40%), international diversity (10%) and financial sustainability (10%) and six areas of studies – humanities, life sciences, natural sciences, technical sciences, social sciences and medical sciences, UVT ranks 626th in the world and 2nd in the country. In the UI GreenMetric World University Rankings, the only ranking in the world that measures the commitment of each participating university in the development of a green infrastructure, UVT ranks 791th globally and 10th nationally. In the Report no. 44/2011 regarding the external evaluation of the academic quality, the Romanian Agency for Quality Assurance in Higher Education (ARACIS) marked UVT as "highly trusting".

A summary of the presence of UVT in national and international rankings is given in the following table:

Notable alumni 

 Simona Amânar (b. 1979), gymnast
 Titu Andreescu (b. 1956), mathematician
 László Borbély (b. 1954), environment minister (2009–2012)
 Emaa (b. 1992), singer and songwriter
 Ovidiu Ganț (b. 1966), MEP (2007)
 Radu Pavel Gheo (b. 1969), prose writer, essayist and playwright
 Sorin Grindeanu (b. 1973), prime minister (2017)
 Beatrice Huștiu (b. 1956), figure skater
 Laura Codruța Kövesi (b. 1973), European Chief Prosecutor (2019–present)
 Cristian Moisescu (1946–2016), mayor of Arad (1992–1996)
 Dan Motreanu (b. 1970), agriculture minister (2006–2007)
 Herta Müller (b. 1953), novelist, poet, essayist and Nobel laureate in literature (2009)
 Mona Muscă (b. 1949), culture minister (2004–2005)
 Dan Negru (b. 1971), TV presenter and host
 Maria Olaru (b. 1982), gymnast
 Paul Radu (b. 1975), investigative journalist and founder of RISE Project
 Andreea Răducan (b. 1983), gymnast
 Daciana Sârbu (b. 1977), MEP (2007–2019)
 George Scripcaru (b. 1966), mayor of Brașov (2004–2020)
 Nicolae Ștefănuță (b. 1982), MEP (2019–present)
 Aura Twarowska (b. 1967), mezzo-soprano
 Dan Vîlceanu (b. 1979), finance minister (2021)
 Chester Williams (1970–2019), rugby player
 Ernest Wichner (b. 1952), writer and translator

References 

West University of Timișoara
Educational institutions established in 1962
1962 establishments in Romania